Sendlinger is an adjective related to Sendling, a borough of Munich, Germany.

It may also refer to:
 Claus Sendlinger (born 1963), German executive
 Sendlinger Straße, shopping street in the city centre of Munich, Germany
 Sendlinger Tor, area of Munich, Germany
 Sendlinger Tor (Munich U-Bahn), its underground station
 Sendlinger murder Christmas, 1705 massacre in Munich, Germany